Porntip Papanai (nickname "Cartoon"; born 1982 in Krabi) is a Thai actress and model. Among her film roles are supporting parts in Pen-Ek Ratanaruang's Monrak Transistor (2001), in which she played the country singer Dao, and Ploy (2007), in which she portrayed Tum, the hotel maid.

She portrayed the legendary Thai ghost Mae Nak in Ghost of Mae Nak in 2005 In 2008 she also featured in Queen of Langkasuka by Nonzee Nimibutr and in 2009 in Nymph, a film about the Thai legendary Nang Mai tree deity.

Films
 Monrak Transistor (มนต์รักทรานซิสเตอร์) 2001.
 Ghost of Mae Nak (นาค รักแท้ วิญญาณ ความตาย) 2005.
 The Elephant King 2006.
 Ploy (พลอย) 2007.
 Soi Cowboy (ซอยคาวบอย) 2008.
 Queens of Langkasuka (ปืนใหญ่จอมสลัด) 2008.
 Nymph (นางไม้) 2009.
 Mindfulness and Murder (ศพไม่เงียบ) 2010.
 Khun Rong Plat Chu (ขุนรองปลัดชู) 2012.

References

External links
 
 Behind the Blur (2009)

1982 births
Porntip Papanai
Porntip Papanai
Living people